Gospel Pilgrim Cemetery was founded in 1882 as a cemetery for African Americans in the 216th general militia district, Athens, Georgia area. Nine acres in size, it contains an estimated 3,500, mostly unmarked, graves.

The Gospel Pilgrim Society founded the cemetery and was "a social and charitable burial insurance organization". The site was listed on the National Register of Historic Places in 2006.

In 2008, the Georgia Historical Society, along with the East Athens Development Corporation, Inc., erected a Georgia Historical Marker at Gospel Pilgrim Cemetery. The marker is located at 4th Street, north of Evelyn C. Neely Drive in Athens.

Gospel Pilgrim Society
Social and charitable lodges became very popular during the period after the Civil War.  By 1912, the African-American community had eight orders - including the Gospel Pilgrims - with a total of 29 lodges in Athens, Georgia. The membership of these lodges totaled about 2,500 people that year, "or about 75 percent of the adult black population of Athens". The origin of the name, "Gospel Pilgrim", is unknown.

Cemetery
In 1882, the Gospel Pilgrim Society purchased 8.25 acres from the estate of William P. Talmadge. He was a white blacksmith; his widow and executrix, Elizabeth Talmadge sold the property for $238.50. The deed lists the probably illiterate laborer, Green Bullock, as the president of the society at the time of the sale. In 1902, the society purchased an additional 0.75 acres from George P. Brightwell. Finally, in 1905, a 100'x60' parcel was transferred to neighboring Springfield Baptist Church to give the cemetery its current dimensions, bordering Fourth Street and what is now the Seaboard Airline Railway. A 2004 survey found the acreage to be 10.071 acres, slightly larger than given in the deeds.

The earliest burials date from 1885, and most of those are from the family of Monroe B. Morton a successful contractor, property owner, newspaper publisher, and developer whose Morton Building  in Athens included the Morton Theater and offices for African American professionals. Other smaller cemeteries for African Americans were associated with churches throughout the county, but Gospel Pilgrim was "Athens' first major cemetery controlled by African Americans." Burials were performed there regularly until the 1960s, with the peak decade being the 1940s. and the cemetery fell into disuse and disrepair, probably due to lack of funding; the last burial took place in 2003.

Athens-Clarke County hired attorney Jim Warnes to do a title search on the property; he found no owner, and in 2002, the cemetery "was declared an abandoned property". Warnes did find a Georgia law "which allows local governments to use local funds to care for abandoned property without the local government assuming ownership or responsibility."

Restoration efforts
In 2007, Athens-Clarke County designated $350,170 for rehabilitation efforts. The restoration project was completed on October 13, 2008. In 2009, the project received an Outstanding Achievement Award from the Athens-Clarke Heritage Foundation and an Excellence in Rehabilitation Award from the Georgia Trust for Historic Preservation.

The University of Georgia's New Media Institute hoped to attract visitors to the site and set up a local phone number that visitors could dial to hear descriptions of the cemetery's history and commentary by Rev. Archibald Killian, a local expert on black history.

Notable burials
Monroe Bowers "Pink" Morton (1856-1919), who built the Morton Theatre
Madison Davis (1833-1902), who, along with Alfred Richardson, was one of two black, former slave, state legislators from Clarke County during Reconstruction. It is worth noting that, "[r]umor has it that Richardson is buried" there, "[b]ut no marked grave has been found for him... Fellow legislator Madison Davis is buried in Gospel Pilgrim with a fine headstone."
 Anne Smith Derricotte (1890-1964), a local Athens teacher
 Juliette Derricotte (1897-1931), educator and Dean of Women, Fisk University
 Samuel F. Harris (1875-1935) - prominent educator and principal of the Athens High & Industrial School from its opening in 1916 until his death
 Charles Hicks (1841-1916), US Army veteran from the 138th Regiment United States Colored Troops (Georgia), Company K.
 William A. Pledger (1852-1904), co-founder of the Athens Blade, a local African American newspaper
Harriet Powers (1837-1910), former enslaved person, folk artist, quilt maker; grave rediscovered in 2005
 Alfred Richardson (1837-1872), who was elected to the Georgia State House from Athens-Clarke County in 1868

Gallery

See also
 National Register of Historic Places listings in Clarke County, Georgia

Notes

References

"Project 24: Gospel Pilgrim Cemetery". Athens-Clarke County Unified Government. SPLOST Project 24. Retrieved 3 April 2017.

External links

 
 Athens Heritage Foundation Walking Tour of Gospel Pilgrim Cemetery with Al Hester (2012), 1 hour virtual guided tour
 Virtual walking tour of Gospel Pilgrim Cemetery circa 2020
 eMaps Gospel Pilgrim Cemetery, University of Georgia, Athens Death Project

African-American cemeteries
African-American history of Georgia (U.S. state)
Buildings and structures completed in 1882
Cemeteries on the National Register of Historic Places in Georgia (U.S. state)
Buildings and structures in Athens, Georgia
National Register of Historic Places in Clarke County, Georgia